House at 240 Sea Cliff Avenue is a historic home located at Sea Cliff in Nassau County, New York.  It was built in 1888 and is an irregularly shaped, -story house with a multiple cross-gabled roof in the Late Victorian style. The -story, gable-roofed east wing was added in 1908. It features a 3-story central tower with a tent roof.

It was listed on the National Register of Historic Places in 1988.

References

Houses on the National Register of Historic Places in New York (state)
Victorian architecture in New York (state)
Houses completed in 1888
Houses in Nassau County, New York
National Register of Historic Places in Nassau County, New York